Elmwood station may refer to:

 Elmwood station (Connecticut), a bus rapid transit station in West Hartford, Connecticut 
 Elmwood station (New York), a former rapid transit station in Rochester, New York
 Elmwood Park station, a commuter rail station in Elmwood Park, Illinois